Science journalism conveys reporting about science to the public. The field typically involves interactions between scientists, journalists, and the public.

Origins
Modern science journalism dates back to Digdarshan (means showing the direction) that was an educational monthly magazine started publication in 1818 from Srirampore, Bengal, India. Digdarshan carried articles on different aspects of science, such as plants, steam boat, etc. It was available in Bengali, Hindi and English languages.  One of the occasions an article was attributed to a "scientific correspondent" was "A Gale in the Bay of Biscay" by William Crookes which appeared in The Times on 18 January 1871, page 7. Thomas Henry Huxley (1825–1895) and John Tyndall (1820–1893) were scientists who were greatly involved in journalism and Peter Chalmers Mitchell (1864–1945) was Scientific Correspondent for The Times from 1918 to 1935. However it was with James Crowther's appointment as the 'scientific correspondent' of The Manchester Guardian by C. P. Scott in 1928 that science journalism really took shape. Crowther related that Scott had declared that there was 'no such thing' as science journalism, at which point Crowther replied that he intended to invent it. Scott was convinced and then employed him.

Aims

The aim of a science journalist is to render very detailed, specific, and often jargon-laden information produced by scientists into a form that non-scientists can understand and appreciate while still communicating the information accurately. One way science journalism can achieve that is to avoid an information deficit model of communication, which assumes a top-down, one-way direction of communicating information that limits an open dialogue between knowledge holders and the public. One such way of sparking an inclusive dialogue between science and society that leads to a broader uptake of post-high school science discoveries is science blogs. Science journalists face an increasing need to convey factually correct information through storytelling techniques in order to tap both into the rational and emotional side of their audiences, the latter of which to some extent ensuring that the information uptake persists. 

Science journalists often have training in the scientific disciplines that they cover. Some have earned a degree in a scientific field before becoming journalists or exhibited talent in writing about science subjects. However, good preparation for interviews and even deceptively simple questions such as "What does this mean to the people on the street?" can often help a science journalist develop material that is useful for the intended audience.

Status
With budget cuts at major newspapers and other media, there are fewer working science journalists working for traditional print and broadcast media than before. Similarly, there are currently very few journalists in traditional media outlets that write multiple articles on emerging science, such as nanotechnology.

In 2011, there were 459 journalists who had written a newspaper article covering nanotechnology, of whom 7 wrote about the topic more than 25 times.

In January 2012, just a week after The Daily Climate reported that worldwide coverage of climate change continued a three-year slide in 2012 and that among the five largest US dailies, the New York Times published the most stories and had the biggest increase in coverage, that newspaper announced that it was dismantling its environmental desk and merging its journalists with other departments.

News coverage on science by traditional media outlets, such as newspapers, magazines, radio, and news broadcasts is being replaced by online sources. In April 2012, the New York Times was awarded two Pulitzer Prizes for content published by Politico and The Huffington Post, both online sources, a sign of the platform shift by the media outlet.

Science information continues to be widely available to the public online. The increase in access to scientific studies and findings causes science journalism to adapt. "In many countries the public's main source of information about science and technology is the mass media." Science journalists must compete for attention with other stories that are perceived as more entertaining. Science information cannot always be sensationalized to capture attention and the sheer amount of available information can cause important findings to be buried. The general public doesn't typically search for science information unless it is mentioned or discussed in mainstream media first. However, the mass media are the most important or only source of scientific information for people after completing their education.

A common misconception about public interest surrounds science journalism. Those who choose which news stories are important typically assume the public is not as interested in news written by a scientist and would rather receive news stories that are written by general reporters instead. The results of a study conducted comparing public interest between news stories written by scientists and stories written by reporters concluded there is no significant difference. The public was equally interested in news stories written by a reporter and a scientist. This is a positive finding for science journalism because it shows it is increasingly relevant and is relied upon by the public to make informed decisions. "The vast majority of non-specialists obtain almost all their knowledge about science from journalists, who serve as the primary gatekeepers for scientific information." Ethical and accurate reporting by science journalists is vital to keeping the public informed.

Science journalism is reported differently than traditional journalism. Traditionally, journalism is seen as more ethical if it is balanced reporting and includes information from both sides of an issue. Science journalism has moved to an authoritative type of reporting where they present information based on peer reviewed evidence and either ignore the conflicting side or point out their lack of evidence. Science journalism continues to adapt to a slow journalism method that is very time-consuming but contains higher quality information from peer reviewed sources. They also practice sustainable journalism that focuses on solutions rather than only the problem. Presenting information from both sides of the issue can confuse readers on what the actual findings show. Balanced reporting can actually lead to unbalanced reporting because it gives attention to views that hold a very small majority in the science community. It can give the false impression that the opposing viewpoint is valid. The public benefits from an authoritative reporting style in guiding them to make informed decisions about their lifestyle and health.

Tracking the remaining experienced science journalists is becoming increasingly difficult. For example, in Australia, the number of science journalists have decreased to abysmal numbers "you need less than one hand to count them." Due to the rapidly decreasing number of science journalists, experiments on ways to improve science journalism are also rare. However, in one of the few experiments conducted with science journalists, when the remaining population of science journalists networked online the produced more accurate articles than when in isolation. New communication environments provide essentially unlimited information on a large number of issues, which can be obtained anywhere and with relatively limited effort. The web also offers opportunities for citizens to connect with others through social media and other 2.0-type tools to make sense of this information.

"After a lot of hand wringing about the newspaper industry about six years ago, I take a more optimistic view these days", said Cristine Russell, president of the Council for the Advancement of Science Writing. "The world is online. Science writers today have the opportunity to communicate not just with their audience but globally".

Blog-based science reporting is filling in to some degree, but has problems of its own.

One of the main findings is about the controversy surrounding climate change and how the media affects people's opinions on this topic. Survey and experimental research have discovered connections between exposure to cable and talk show radio channels and views on global warming.  However, early subject analyses noticed that U.S. media outlets over exaggerate the dispute that surrounds global warming actually existing. A majority of Americans view global warming as an outlying issue that will essentially affect future generations of individuals in other countries. This is a problem considering that they are getting most of their information from these media sources that are opinionated and not nearly as concerned with supplying facts to their viewers. Research found that after people finish their education, the media becomes the most significant, and for many individuals, the sole source of information regarding science, scientific findings, and scientific processes. Many people fail to realize that information about science included from online sources is not always credible.

Since the 1980s, climate science and mass media have transformed into an increasingly politicized sphere. In the United States, Conservatives and Liberals understand global warming differently. Democrats often accept the evidence for global warming and think that it's caused by humans, while not many Republicans believe this. Democrats and liberals have higher and more steady trust in scientists, while conservative Republicans' trust in scientists has been declining. However, in the United Kingdom, mass media do not have nearly the impact on people's opinions as in the United States. They have a different attitude towards the environment which prompted them to approve the Kyoto Protocol, which works to reduce carbon dioxide emissions, while the U.S., the world's largest creator of carbon dioxide, has not done so.

The content of news stories regarding climate change are affected by journalistic norms including balance, impartiality, neutrality, and objectivity. Balanced reporting, which involves giving equal time to each opposing side of a debate over an issue, has had a rather harmful impact on the media coverage of climate science.

Chocolate hoax

In 2015, John Bohannon produced a deliberately bad study to see how a low-quality open access publisher and the media would pick up their findings. He worked with a film-maker Peter Onneken who was making a film about junk science in the diet industry with fad diets becoming headline news despite terrible study design and almost no evidence. He invented a fake "diet institute" that lacks even a website, used the pen name "Johannes Bohannon" and fabricated a press release.

Criticism

Science journalists keep the public informed of scientific advancements and assess the appropriateness of scientific research. However, this work comes with a set of criticisms. Science journalists regularly come under criticism for misleading reporting of scientific stories. All three groups of scientists, journalists, and the public often criticize science journalism for bias and inaccuracies. However, with the increasing collaborations online between science journalists there may be potential with removing inaccuracies.
The 2010 book Merchants of Doubt by historians of science Naomi Oreskes and Erik M. Conway argues that in topics like the global warming controversy, tobacco smoking, acid rain, DDT and ozone depletion, contrarian scientists have sought to "keep the controversy alive" in the public arena by demanding that reporters give false balance to the minority side. Very often, such as with climate change, this leaves the public with the impression that disagreement within the scientific community is much greater than it actually is. Science is based on experimental evidence, testing and not dogma, and disputation is a normal activity.

Scholars have criticized science journalists for:

 Uncritical reporting
 Emphasizing frames of scientific progress and economic prospect
 Not presenting a range of expert opinion
 Having preferences toward positive messages
 Reporting unrealistic timelines and engaging in the production of a "cycle of hype"

Science journalists can be seen as the gatekeepers of scientific information. Just like traditional journalists, science journalists are responsible for what truths reach the public.

Scientific information is often costly to access. This is counterproductive to the goals of science journalism. Open science, a movement for "free availability and usability of scholarly publications," seeks to counteract the accessibility issues of valuable scientific information. Freely accessible scientific journals will decrease the public's reliance on potentially biased popular media for scientific information. Science journalists offer important contributions to the open science movement by using the Value Judgement Principle (VJP). Science journalists are responsible for "identifying and explaining major value judgments for members of the public." In other words, science journalists must make judgments such as what is good and bad (right and wrong). This is a very significant role because it helps "equip non-specialists to draw on scientific information and make decisions that accord with their own values". While scientific information is often portrayed in quantitative terms and can be interpreted by experts, the audience must ultimately decide how to feel about the information.

Many science magazines, along with Newspapers like The New York Times and popular science shows like PBS Nova tailor their content to relatively highly educated audiences. Many universities and research institutions focus much of their media outreach efforts on coverage in such outlets. Some government departments require journalists to gain clearance to interview a scientist, and require that a press secretary listen in on phone conversations between government funded scientists and journalists.

Many pharmaceutical marketing representatives have come under fire for offering free meals to doctors in order to promote new drugs. Critics of science journalists have argued that they should disclose whether industry groups have paid for a journalist to travel, or has received free meals or other gifts.

Science journalism finds itself under a critical eye due to the fact that it combines the necessary tasks of a journalist along with the investigative process of a scientist.

Most science journalists begin their careers as either a scientist or a journalist and transition to science communication.

One area in which science journalists seem to support varying sides of an issue is in risk communication. Science journalists may choose to highlight the amount of risk that studies have uncovered while others focus more on the benefits depending on audience and framing. Science journalism in contemporary risk societies leads to the institutionalisation of mediated scientific public spheres which exclusively discuss science and technology related issues. This also leads to the development of new professional relationship between scientists and journalists, which is mutually beneficial.

Types
There are many different examples of science writing. A few examples include feature writing, risk communication, blogs, science books, scientific journals, science podcasts and science magazines.

Notable science journalists 

 Natalie Angier, a science journalist for The New York Times
 Philip Ball, English science writer
 Jules Bergman, a science journalist for ABC News 
 Christopher Bird
 David Bodanis, known for his microphotographic style
 David Bradley (UK journalist)
 William Broad, a science journalist for The New York Times
 Deborah Byrd, of the Earth & Sky radio series
 Nigel Calder
 Siri Carpenter
 Marcus Chown
 Wilson da Silva, editor and co-founder of Cosmos magazine
 Claudia Dreifus
 David Ewing Duncan
 Gregg Easterbrook
 Dan Fagin
 Kitty Ferguson
 Timothy Ferris, science writer, most often on astronomical topics
 Albrecht Fölsing
 Ben Goldacre
 Gina Kolata, science journalist for The New York Times.
 Robert Krulwich
 Robert Kunzig
 Duncan Lunan
 Katherine McAlpine
 Bob McDonald, Canadian science journalist, host of Quirks & Quarks
 Steve Mirsky, columnist for Scientific American
 Chris Mooney, science journalist and author
 Michelle Nijhuis
 Dennis Overbye of The New York Times
Peter Hadfield, freelance journalist and ex-geologist, known for his YouTube channel 'Potholer54'
 Michael Pollan
 David Quammen, science, nature and travel writer
 Mary Roach
 Matt Ridley, science journalist and author, columnist at the Wall Street Journal
 Kirsten Sanford
 Rebecca Skloot 
 Meredith Small
 John Timmer
 Nicholas Wade, a science journalist for The New York Times
 Robyn Williams
 Jeff Wise
 Carl Zimmer
 Nagendra Vijay

See also

 Columbia Journalism Review
 False balance
 Frontiers of Science, defunct illustrated comic strip
 Further research is needed
 MATTER, (magazine)
 Knight Science Journalism Fellowships, a science journalism fellowship program launched in 1983
 Open science
 Popular science
 Public awareness of science
 Science by press conference
 Science communication
Science Journalism (textbook)
 Scientific literature
 Science Writing
Telling Science Stories (textbook)
 Undark Magazine, science magazine published under the auspices of the Knight Science Journalism Fellowship program

References

External links

Further reading
 
 

Journalism by field